The Körös or Criș (German: Kreisch) is a river in eastern Hungary and western Romania. It has three source rivers, all of which have their origin in the Apuseni Mountains in Transylvania, Romania: Crișul Alb (Fehér-Körös), Crișul Negru (Fekete-Körös) and Crișul Repede (Sebes-Körös). The confluence of the rivers Fehér-Körös (Crișul Alb) and Fekete-Körös (Crișul Negru) is near the town Gyula. The Körös downstream from Gyula is also called the Kettős-Körös (Hungarian for "double Körös"). 37.3 km further downstream, near Gyomaendrőd, the Sebes-Körös (Crișul Repede) joins the Criș/Körös. The section downstream from Gyomaendrőd is also called the Hármas-Körös (Hungarian for "triple Körös"). The Körös flows into the Tisza River near Csongrád.

It was known in antiquity as the "Chrysus", Crisus, Crisia, Grisia, or Gerasus.

References

 
Rivers of Hungary
International rivers of Europe